Lowell Orton North (December 2, 1929 – June 2, 2019) was an American sailor and Olympic gold medalist. He competed at the 1968 Summer Olympics in Mexico City, where he received a gold medal in the Star class with the boat North Star, together with Peter Barrett.

Biography
North was born in Springfield, Missouri on December 2, 1929. He was the son of Williard North, a geophysicist for oil companies, and Juanita Williams North, a homemaker. When Lowell was young the family moved to Southern California, where he learned to sail in Newport Beach and later in San Diego.

He got his start as a sailmaker at the age of 14, when he and his father raced Star class boats and regularly lost. He recut the sail and improved their record. In 1945, at age 15, he crewed for Malin Burnham in the Star World Championships, which they won. North later said, "It wasn’t me Malin wanted. It was my mainsail." During the next 30 years he won another four Star Worlds.

He studied at San Diego State College and earned a degree in civil engineering from the University of California, Berkeley. He worked as a structural engineer in the aerospace industry, but sail design remained his main passion. He opened his first sail making company in the late 1950s, where "his methodical and scientific approach to sailmaking changed the industry." He used computer modeling, new materials, and advanced manufacturing techniques. In 1957 he founded North Sails, a world-wide company producing sailing equipment, in San Diego.

He received a bronze medal in the Dragon class at the 1964 Summer Olympics in Tokyo.

North participated in 1977 America's Cup defender series where he skippered the 12 metre yacht Enterprise.

North retired in 1984. In 2011, he was inducted into the National Sailing Hall of Fame.

Personal life
In 1956 he married Kay Gillette North (March 9, 1933 – September 5, 2021). They had three children: Danny, Holly, and Julie. They later divorced. In 1994 he married Helen Beatrice Davidson, known as Bea, who survived him.

See also
 Star World Championships – Multiple medallist
 List of Olympic medalists in Dragon class sailing

References

External links
 North Sails website
 Sailing World
National Sailing Hall of Fame
 

1929 births
American male sailors (sport)
2019 deaths
Olympic gold medalists for the United States in sailing
Sportspeople from Springfield, Missouri
Sailmakers
Sailors at the 1964 Summer Olympics – Dragon
Sailors at the 1968 Summer Olympics – Star
San Diego Yacht Club sailors
Star class world champions
US Sailor of the Year
Medalists at the 1968 Summer Olympics
Medalists at the 1964 Summer Olympics
Olympic bronze medalists for the United States in sailing
1977 America's Cup sailors
World champions in sailing for the United States
Soling class sailors
University of California, Berkeley alumni